Nyetimber Mill  is a grade II listed tower mill at Pagham, Sussex, England which has been converted to residential use.

History

Nyetimber Mill was built in the early 1840s and was working until tailwinded in 1915. The sails were on the mill until they were struck by lightning in 1927. The mill became derelict and was burnt out in 1962, leaving the windshaft perched above the ivy covered tower.  The mill was converted to a house by 2005.

Description

Nyetimber Mill is a four-storey brick tower mill with an ogee cap. It had four Patent sails and was winded by a fantail. The mill drove two pairs of millstones. An external pulley enabled the mill to be worked by an engine. This has been retained in the converted mill.

Millers

William Adams 1840s - 1905
W Prior - 1915

References for above:-

References

External links
Windmill World Page on Nytimber  windmill.

Further reading
 Online version

Industrial buildings completed in the 19th century
Towers completed in the 1840s
Tower mills in the United Kingdom
Grinding mills in the United Kingdom
Grade II listed buildings in West Sussex
Windmills in West Sussex
1840s establishments in England